The Petkov Government, known as the Four-party coalition cabinet, was the ninety-sixth cabinet of Bulgaria. Chaired by prime minister Kiril Petkov, it was approved by the National Assembly on 13 December 2021 after the government formation as a result of the November 2021 parliamentary election. It was a so-called Vivaldi coalition, named after composer Antonio Vivaldi due to his work The Four Seasons which corresponds to the different political views present in this coalition: liberals (PP and Yes, Bulgaria!, as part of DB), socialists (BSP), greens (ZD, as part of DB) and conservatives (ITN and DSB, as part of DB). The government became a Minority government on 8 June 2022, when ITN pulled out of the government, and its mandate ended in late June 2022. It was the first government in Bulgarian history to lose a vote of confidence. On 1 July, Bulgarian President Rumen Radev asked Asen Vasilev to form a new government, which Vasilev failed to do and new elections were scheduled to take place.

Cabinet

Changes

From 1 March 2022 
On 1 March 2022 the defence minister Stefan Yanev resigned and his resignation was approved by the National Assembly. Dragomir Zakov was appointed as the new defence minister.

From June 2022 
On 8 June the leader of ITN Slavi Trifonov aired a television announcement that his party is leaving the coalition, and thus turning the Petkov Government into a minority government.

Removal 

After ITN left the government, GERB tabled a vote of no confidence in the government, which was scheduled for 22 June 2022. 6 ITN deputies left the party to support the government. Several rallies in support of the government, as well as protests against it were held in the days coming up to the vote.

On 22 June, the vote was held, with 123 votes against the government and 116 for it. All three remaining parties in the coalition, the six ITN defectors, and by mistake one DPS MP voted for the government, with all other MPs voting against it.

Notes

References 

2021 in Bulgaria
Politics of Bulgaria
Cabinets established in 2021
2021 establishments in Bulgaria